Giuseppe Rotunno (19 March 1923 – 7 February 2021) was an Italian cinematographer.

Biography
Sometimes credited as Peppino Rotunno, he was director of photography on eight films by Federico Fellini. He collaborated with several celebrated Italian directors including; Vittorio De Sica on Yesterday, Today and Tomorrow starring Sophia Loren and Marcello Mastroianni, and Luchino Visconti on Rocco and His Brothers (1960), The Leopard (1963), and The Stranger (1967). Rotunno also served as the director of photography for Julia and Julia (1987), the first feature shot using high definition television taping technique and then transferred to 35 mm film.

He was nominated for the Academy Award for Best Cinematography for All That Jazz and won seven Silver Ribbon Awards.

Rotunno was the first non-American member admitted to the American Society of Cinematographers in 1966.

Rotunno died on 7 February 2021, at the age of 97.

Filmography

1950s 

 Scandal in Sorrento (1955)
 Christ Stopped at Eboli (1955)
 Tosca (1956)
 The Monte Carlo Story (1956)
 White Nights (1957)
 Anna of Brooklyn (1958)
 The Love Specialist (1958)
 The Naked Maja (1958)
 Policarpo (1959)
 The Great War (1959)
 On the Beach (1959)

1960s 
Five Branded Women (1960)
The Angel Wore Red (1960)
Rocco and His Brothers (1960)
Phantom Lovers (1961)
The Best of Enemies (1961)
Boccaccio '70 (1962)
Family Diary (1962)
The Leopard (1963)
The Organizer (1963)
Yesterday, Today and Tomorrow (1963)
The Bible: In the Beginning... (1966)
The Witches (1967)
The Stranger (1967)
Spirits of the Dead (1968)
Caprice Italian Style (1968)
Anzio (1968)
Candy (1968)
Fellini Satyricon (1969)
The Secret of Santa Vittoria (1969)

1970s 
Sunflower (1970)
Splendori e miserie di Madame Royale (1970)
Carnal Knowledge (1971)
Roma (1972)
Man of La Mancha (1972)
Love and Anarchy (1973)
Amarcord (1973)
All Screwed Up (1974)
Erotomania (1974)
The Beast (1974)
The Divine Nymph (1975)
Fellini's Casanova (1976)
Origins of the Mafia (1976)
Stormtroopers (1976)
Ecco noi per esempio (1977)
A Night Full of Rain (1978)
China 9, Liberty 37 (1978)
Orchestra Rehearsal (1978)
All That Jazz (1979)

1980s 
City of Women (1980)
Popeye (1980)
Rollover (1981)
My Darling, My Dearest (1982)
Five Days One Summer (1982)
The Scarlet and the Black (1983)
And the Ship Sails On (1983)
American Dreamer (1984)
Nothing Left to Do But Cry (1984)
The Assisi Underground (1985)
Red Sonja (1985)
Hotel Colonial (1987)
Julia and Julia (1987)
Rent-a-Cop (1988)
Haunted Summer (1988)
The Adventures of Baron Munchausen (1988)

1990s 
The Bachelor (1990)
Regarding Henry (1991)
Once Upon a Crime (1992)
Wolf (1994)
The Night and the Moment (1995)
Sabrina (1995)
The Stendhal Syndrome (1996)
Marcello Mastroianni: I Remember (1997)

References

External links
 

1923 births
2021 deaths
Best Cinematography BAFTA Award winners
David di Donatello winners
David di Donatello Career Award winners
Italian cinematographers
Film people from Rome